Ejura-Sekyedumase is one of the constituencies represented in the Parliament of Ghana. It elects one Member of Parliament (MP) by the first past the post system of election. Ejura-Sekyedumase is located in the Ejura-Sekyedumase district  of the Ashanti Region of Ghana.

Boundaries
The seat is located within the Ejura-Sekyedumase District of the Ashanti Region of Ghana. It shares boundaries with Mampong Constituency, Nkoranza south constituency and Atebubu Amantin constituency respectively.

Members of Parliament

Elections

See also
List of Ghana Parliament constituencies

References

Parliamentary constituencies in the Ashanti Region